The 55th Illinois General Assembly met from 1927 to 1929. Fred E. Sterling of Rockford was the Lieutenant Governor of Illinois and thus ex officio President of the Senate. Richard J. Barr of Joliet was President pro tempore of the Senate. Robert Scholes of Peoria was the Speaker of the House of Representatives.

Districts
Illinois was divided into 51 districts, each of which elected one Senator and three Representatives. Districts were last reapportioned in 1901 and would not be reapportioned again until 1947.

The counties of each district were as follows:
1st, 2nd, 3rd, 4th, 5th, 6th, 7th, 9th, 11th, 13th, 15th, 17th, 19th, 21st, 23rd, 25th, 27th, 29th, and 31st: Parts of Cook
8th: Lake, McHenry, and Boone
10th: Ogle and Winnebago
12th: Stephenson, Jo Daviess, and Carroll
14th: Kane and Kendall
16th: Marshall, Putnam, Livingston, and Woodford
18th: Peoria
20th: Grundy, Kankakee, and Iroquois
22nd: Vermillion and Edgar
24th: Champaign, Piatt, and Moultrie
26th: Ford and McLean
28th: DeWitt, Logan, and Macon
30th: Tazewell, Mason, Menard, Cass, Schuyler, and Brown
32nd: Hancock, McDonough, and Warren
33rd: Henderson, Mercer, and Rock Island
34th: Douglas, Coles, and Clark
35th: Whiteside, Lee, and DeKalb
36th: Adams, Pike, Calhoun, and Scott
37th: Henry, Stark, and Bureau
38th: Greene, Jersey, Macoupin, and Montgomery
39th: LaSalle
40th: Christian, Shelby, Cumberland, and Fayette
41st: DuPage and Will
42nd: Clinton, Marion, Clay, and Effingham
43rd: Knox and Fulton
44th: Jackson, Perry, Washington, Randolph, and Monroe
45th: Morgan and Sangamon
46th: Jefferson, Wayne, Richland, and Jasper
47th: Madison and Bond
48th: Hardin, Gallatin, White, Edwards, Wabash, Lawrence, and Crawford
49th: St. Clair
50th: Hamilton, Saline, Pope, Johnson, and Massac
51st: Franklin, Williamson, Union, Pulaski, and Alexander

See also
List of Illinois state legislatures

Notes

References

Bibliography

Illinois legislative sessions
1927 in Illinois
1928 in Illinois
1927 U.S. legislative sessions
1928 U.S. legislative sessions